Ardovo  a village and municipality in the Rožňava District in the Košice Region of eastern Slovakia.

History
In historical records the village was first mentioned in 1243.

Geography
It has a population of about 840 people.

Ethnicity
The population is about 99% Slovak in ethnicity.

Culture
The village has a small public library, a post office, a football pitch and a food store.

Genealogical resources

The records for genealogical research are available at the state archive "Statny Archiv in Kosice, Slovakia"

 Roman Catholic church records (births/marriages/deaths): 1825-1895
 Lutheran church records (births/marriages/deaths): 1701-1852 (parish: B), 1852-1895 (parish: C)
 Census records 1869 of Ardovo are not available at the state archive.

See also
 List of municipalities and towns in Slovakia

External links
https://web.archive.org/web/20070513023228/http://www.statistics.sk/mosmis/eng/run.html
http://www.ardovo.ou.sk
Surnames of living people in Ardovo

Villages and municipalities in Rožňava District